A concrete bomb is an aerial bomb containing dense, inert material (typically concrete) instead of explosive.  The target is destroyed using the kinetic energy of the falling bomb, making it a kinetic energy weapon.  Such weapons can only practically be deployed when configured as a laser-guided bomb or other form of smart bomb, as a direct hit on a small target is required to cause significant damage.  They are typically used to destroy military vehicles and artillery pieces in urban areas to minimise collateral damage and civilian casualties.

Guided or unguided concrete bombs may also be used for training pilots and ground personnel, due to the advantages of cost (no explosives or fusing), ease of precise and accurate point of impact determination, minimised bombing range damage, and increased safety (when the bomb is deployed, it is inert). Concrete bombs are also used in testing and evaluation of aircraft and bombs, such as the BDU-50.

Concrete bombs have been utilised by the United States during the Iraqi no-fly zones conflict, and by France during the 2011 military intervention in Libya.

See also
Kinetic bombardment
Lazy Dog (bomb)
Roof knocking

References

Aerial bombs